Amphinase is a ribonuclease enzyme found in the oocytes of the Northern leopard frog (Rana pipiens). Amphinase is a member of the pancreatic ribonuclease protein superfamily and degrades long RNA substrates. Along with ranpirnase, another leopard frog ribonuclease, amphinase has been studied as a potential cancer therapy due to its unusual mechanism of cytotoxicity tested against tumor cells.

References 

Ribonucleases
EC 3.1.27